Scaphidriotis xylogramma is a moth of the subfamily Arctiinae. It was described by Turner in 1899. It is found in the Australian state of Queensland.

References

Lithosiini
Moths described in 1899